Boy van Vliet (born 13 July 1994) is a Dutch basketball player who plays for Heroes Den Bosch of the BNXT League. He is also a regular member of the Netherlands national basketball team.

College career
Van Vliet played his first two seasons with North Iowa Area Community College (2014–2016). From 2016 to 2018, he played with the Dallas Baptist Patriots. Here, he played two seasons and averaged 14.8 points in the NCAA Division II.

College statistics

|-
| style="text-align:left;"| 2016–17
| style="text-align:left;"| Dallas Baptist
|34 || 18 || 22.8 || .447 || .350||.655 || 2.4 || 2.9 || .8 || .1 || 8.3
|-
| style="text-align:left;"| 2017–18
| style="text-align:left;"| Dallas Baptist
| 32 || 32 || 31.2 || .486 || .298 || .780 || 4.7 || 4.6 || 1.2 || .3 || 14.8
|-

Professional career
On 11 July 2018, Van Vliet signed a one-year contract with Den Helder Suns of the Dutch Basketball League (DBL). On 18 April 2019, he won the DBL Rookie of the Year award.

On 12 October 2019, Van Vliet signed a two-year contract with Heroes Den Bosch of his hometown 's-Hertogenbosch. He averaged 7.3 points and 1.6 assists in his first season with Heroes.

In his second season with Heroes, Van Vliet reached the Finals of the DBL for the first time, where the team lost to ZZ Leiden. He averaged 6.3 points and 3.0 assists per game. Van Vliet signed a two-year extension with the team on 9 July 2021.

National team career
On 16 November 2018, Van Vliet was selected by head coach Toon van Helfteren to be a part of the Netherlands senior team for the first time.

References

1994 births
Living people
Dallas Baptist Patriots men's basketball players
Den Helder Suns players
Dutch Basketball League players
Dutch expatriate basketball people in the United States
Dutch men's basketball players
Heroes Den Bosch players
Junior college men's basketball players in the United States
Sportspeople from 's-Hertogenbosch
Shooting guards